Dasypogonaceae is a family of flowering plants, one that has not been commonly recognized by taxonomists; the plants it contains were usually included in the family Xanthorrhoeaceae. If valid, Dasypogonaceae includes four genera with 16 species.

The 2016 APG IV system places the family in the order Arecales, after several studies revealed the family as a sister-family to Arecaceae.

The earlier APG III (2009), APG II (2003), and the 1998 APG system all accepted the validity of the family, assigning it to the clade commelinids, but leaving it unplaced as to order. The commelinids are monocots, the broad group to which, in any event, these plant clearly belong.

The family is endemic to Australia, and comprises 16 species in four genera. The best known representative is Kingia australis.

References

External links 
 
 Dasypogonaceae , Calectasiaceae in L. Watson and M.J. Dallwitz (1992 onwards). The families of flowering plants: descriptions, illustrations, identification, information retrieval. Version: 9 March 2006. https://web.archive.org/web/20070103200438/http://delta-intkey.com/.
 Dasypogonaceae in Western Australia  [70 entries]

 
Commelinid families
Plant families endemic to Australia
Arecales